Živo i akustično is the Električni Orgazam unplugged album, released in 1996.

Track listing 
Source: Discogs

Personnel 
 Srđan Gojković Gile (guitar, vocals)
 Branislav Petrović Banana (guitar, vocals)
 Zoran Radomirović Švaba (bass vocals)
 Miloš Velimir Buca (drums)

Additional personnel 
 Zdenko Kolar (band introduction on track 1)
 Margita Stefanović (piano, organ)
 Boris Bunjac (percussion)
 Melina Appiah (backing vocals)
 Ninela (backing vocals)
 Deže Molnar (saxophone on track 11)

References 

1996 live albums
Električni Orgazam live albums